Comptoir des Cotonniers is a French contemporary fashion brand.

History 

In November 2013, Fast Retailing appointed Nancy Pedot the new CEO of Comptoir des Cotonniers and Princess Tam Tam.

In December 2013, Amélie Gillier left Comptoir des Cotonniers as creative director. In January 2014, Lars Nilsson was appointed artistic director of both Comptoir des Cotonniers and Princesse Tam Tam brands.

References

Fast Retailing
Clothing brands
French brands
2010s fashion